The Cleveland Browns are a professional American football team in Cleveland, Ohio. The Browns compete in the National Football League (NFL) as a member of the American Football Conference (AFC) North division.

Since joining the NFL in 1950, the Browns have had 61 quarterbacks start in at least one game for the team. Pro Football Hall of Famer Otto Graham led the Browns to three NFL championships in their first six seasons in the league. 

After resuming play in 1999 following a three-year suspension of operations, the franchise has been notable for its instability at the quarterback position. From 1999 through week 13 of the 2022 season, the team has had 34 players start at quarterback, with only three seasons (2001 with Tim Couch, 2019 and 2020 with Baker Mayfield) where the same quarterback started every game.

Starters per season

The number of regular season games each player started during the season is listed to the right.

Most games started

Quarterbacks who have started for the Cleveland Browns from the team's first NFL season of 1950 to present. A player is credited with a win if he started the game and the team won that game, no matter if the player was injured or permanently removed after the first play from scrimmage. Only regular season games are included. The Browns' All-America Football Conference games from 1946 to 1949 are not included.

(Note: the Browns did not field a team during the years 1996–98.)

Sorted by number of starts. Members of the Pro Football Hall of Fame in italics and most recent starter in bold.

Postseason
These Browns quarterbacks started during the postseason.

Pro Bowl selections 
These Browns starting quarterbacks have been selected to the Pro Bowl.

See also

 List of NFL starting quarterbacks

References

Database Football.com, last accessed 10/24/07
Pro Football Reference.com, last accessed 12/29/08
Cleveland Plain Dealer's Browns History Database, last Retrieved February 7, 2008
Bill Levy, Return to Glory: The Story of the Cleveland Browns, (The World Publishing Co., 1965) LCCN 65023356.

Cleveland Browns
Cleveland Browns players
Cleveland Browns (AAFC) players
quarterbacks